Shkhawr is a village in Badakhshan Province in north-eastern Afghanistan.

The village is inhabited by Wakhi people.  The population of the village (2003) is 454.

See also
Badakhshan Province

References

External links
Satellite map at Maplandia.com

Populated places in Badakhshan Province
Wakhan